Christian Foget Andersen (born 18 June 1967) is a Danish former cyclist. He competed in the individual road race at the 1992 Summer Olympics.

References

External links
 

1967 births
Living people
Danish male cyclists
Olympic cyclists of Denmark
Cyclists at the 1992 Summer Olympics